Misterjaw is a 34-episode cartoon television series, produced at DePatie-Freleng Enterprises in 1976 for The Pink Panther Laugh and a Half Hour and a Half Show television series on NBC. Reruns continued on the Think Pink Panther Show on NBC through September 3, 1978.

Plot
Misterjaw (voiced by Arte Johnson) was a blue-colored great white shark (who wore a purple vest with white collar, a black bow tie and black top hat) who liked to leap out of the water and shout "HEEGotcha!" or "Gotcha!" at unsuspecting folks who would run off in terror. He spoke with a German accent and was known to mispronounce words, such as "knucklehead" pronounced as "ka-nucklehead". He also had a sidekick, a green-scaled, brown bowler hatted Brooklyn-accented catfish named Catfish (voiced by Arnold Stang) who usually referred to Misterjaw as "Boss" or "Chief"; Misterjaw usually called Catfish either "pal-ly", "fella" or "sonny" when in a good mood, or names like "dumbkoff", "ka-nucklehead" or "macaroni brain" when irritated. At times, Misterjaw would mistakenly address his sidekick as "Dogfish", only to correct himself a split second later by saying "I mean, Catfish".

The primary goal of Misterjaw and Catfish was to catch Harry Halibut (voiced by Bob Ogle). In several instances, the duo were pursued by Fearless Freddy the Shark Hunter (voiced by Paul Winchell) in Merry Sharkman, Merry Sharkman and To Catch a Halibut.

All entries were directed by Robert McKimson (who died suddenly after production was completed) with co-direction from Sid Marcus and produced by David H. DePatie and Friz Freleng. The music and score for the series were composed by Doug Goodwin. A brief version of the John Williams Jaws theme was used with the variation of the two-note theme. None of the shorts contained any credit information; only the series title, episode title, 1976 copyright and end titles were shown. All episodes include a laugh track.

Episodes
All episodes were directed by Robert McKimson and Sid Marcus.

 Flying Fool
 Shopping Spree
 To Catch a Halibut
 Beach Resort
 Monster of the Deep
 Showbiz Shark
 Aladdin's Lump
 Little Red Riding Halibut (a parody of Little Red Riding Hood)
 The Codfather (a takeoff of The Godfather, title is the same most of previous series The Dogfather)
 Davey Jones' Locker
 Flying Saucer
 The Shape of Things
 Caught In The Act
 Merry Sharkman, Merry Sharkman (a takeoff of Mary Hartman, Mary Hartman)
 Sea Chase
 Aloha, Hah, Hah!
 Never Shake Hands with a Piranha
 Stand-In Room Only
 The Fishy Time Machine
 Transistorized Shark
 The $6.95 Bionic Shark (a takeoff of The Six Million Dollar Man)
 Moulin Rogues
 Holiday in Venice
 Shark and the Beanstalk (a parody of Jack and the Beanstalk)
 The Aquanuts
 Cannery Caper
 Fish Anonymous
 Maguiness Book of Records (a take of Guinness Book of World Records)
 Cool Shark
 Deep Sea Rodeo
 Mama
 Easy Come Easy Go
 No Man's Halibut
 Sweat Hog Shark (a reference to Welcome Back, Kotter)

Episodes 2, 3, 5, 13, 21, 22, and 26 were pulled from NBC's 1977-1978 reruns of the show.

Production notes

 Misterjaw is the fifth and final cartoon series to appear in the MGM Television distribution package.
 Misterjaw was one of two cartoon sharks created as a cash-in on the Jaws craze, (the other being the Hanna-Barbera-created Jabberjaw).
 As of July 2005, Misterjaw has regularly been seen on Cartoon Network's Boomerang in the United States (along with The Pink Panther Show and other DePatie-Freleng cartoons). As of 2006, all the Misterjaw episodes have been aired. Three of the cartoons shown on Boomerang have been edited (some scenes from Beach Resort, Monster of the Deep, and the ending of Holiday in Venice were removed).
 The show was also known as Mr. Jaws and Catfish.
 In the entry Little Red Riding Halibut, Misterjaw quips "Verrry interesting..." after looking in a picnic basket that Harry Halibut left behind which was booby-trapped with mousetraps. This catchphrase was first uttered by Arte Johnson (who voiced Misterjaw) on Rowan & Martin's Laugh-In.
 Misterjaw was featured on South African television in the 1980s as a morning cartoon called "Grootbek en Katvis" and was dubbed into Afrikaans.

Home video

VHS
Misterjaw Cartoon Festival Featuring Monster of the Deep was released for VHS on 1987 as part of the "Viddy-Oh for Kids". It contains the first five episodes of the series.

DVD / Blu-ray
The complete series was digitally remastered, issued on its own two-disc Blu-Ray/DVD collection (the first 17 shorts on disc 1 and the last 17 shorts on disc 2) by Kino International (under licensed from MGM). It was released on April 24, 2018.

References

External links
 Misterjaw at Don Markstein's Toonopedia. Archived from the original on March 8, 2016.
 Toonarific
 

1970s American animated television series
1976 American television series debuts
1977 American television series endings
American children's animated comedy television series
Fictional sharks
Television series by DePatie–Freleng Enterprises
Television series by United Artists Television
The Pink Panther Show